Titus Brian Ahumuza    commonly known as Abryanz is a Ugandan  fashion designer.

Early life and education
Abryanz was born in Masindi on 1 November 1990. He studied at Asaba Primary School, Bugema Adventist Secondary School and graduated with  a bachelor's degree in Social Work & Social Administration from Kyambogo University.

Career
In 2009  he started his own label Abryanz Collection. His designs have showcased in Uganda, Nigeria, South Africa, Africa Fashion week. He has featured in different issues of prestigious vogue magazines.

In 2013, he launched the  Abryanz Style and Fashion Awards (ASFAs), a continental fashion awards in Uganda with the aim to reward  the outstanding achievement in the fashion industry in Africa

Recognition
In 2017, Abryanz was awarded as the Best Fashion Designer in  Starqt Awards in South Africa as well as the CEPA Young Entrepreneur in 2016. In 2016, he featured as one of Africa's raising stars on CNN's African Voices.

References

External links
7 Days of the Fashion Industry with Brian Ahumuza: What is Fashion?
Celebrity Biography: Fashionista Abryanz
Top 10 Ugandan personalities that rocked 2017
Abryanz to hold fashion summit
Abryanz reveals fashion inspiration – Sqoop – Get Uganda entertainment news, celebrity gossip, videos and photos

Living people
Ugandan fashion designers
Kyambogo University alumni
1990 births